Music from West Side Story is a 1986 compilation album by Dave Brubeck and his quartet of music from Leonard Bernstein and Stephen Sondheim musical West Side Story, with other tracks taken from Brubeck's albums Bernstein Plays Brubeck Plays Bernstein (1960) and Anything Goes: The Music of Cole Porter (1966) and My Favorite Things (1965).

Reception

The album was reviewed by Bruce Eder at AllMusic, who wrote that it was "one of the more often overlooked albums" in Brubeck's Columbia catalog and described it as "a lot of fun and well worth hearing ... [the whole record] swings in some unexpected directions that still delight four-plus decades later."

Track listing 
 "Maria" (Leonard Bernstein, Stephen Sondheim) - 3:15
 "I Feel Pretty" (Bernstein, Sondheim) - 5:07
 "Somewhere" (Bernstein, Sondheim) - 4:14
 "A Quiet Girl" (Bernstein, Betty Comden, Adolph Green) - 2:21
 "Tonight" (Bernstein, Sondheim) - 3:46
 "What Is This Thing Called Love?" (Cole Porter) - 6:15
 "The Most Beautiful Girl in the World" (Lorenz Hart, Richard Rodgers) - 5:16
 "Night and Day" (Porter) - 4:54
 "My Romance" (Hart, Rodgers) - 6:48

Personnel 
 Dave Brubeck - piano
 Paul Desmond - alto saxophone
 Eugene Wright - double bass
 Joe Morello - drums
Production
 Michael Berniker - CD Preparation
 Steve Byram - design
 Tim Geelan - engineer
 Warren Linn - illustrations
 Ambrose Reynolds - liner notes
 Teo Macero - producer

References

1986 compilation albums
Albums produced by Teo Macero
Columbia Records compilation albums
Dave Brubeck albums
Instrumental albums